Balbalasang–Balbalan National Park (also known as Mount Balbalasang National Park) is a protected area of the Philippines located in the municipality of Balbalan, Kalinga in the Cordillera Administrative Region. The park covers an area of 1,338 hectares and is centered on Mount Balbalasang in the barangay of the same name near the provincial border with Abra. Dubbed the "green heart of the Cordillera", the park is representative of the rich biodiversity and landscape of this mountain region with some of the most intact pine forests and richly endemic flora and fauna. It was declared a national park in 1972 by virtue of Republic Act No. 6463.

Topography

The Park belongs to the Luzon Biogeographic Region, a unique center of endemism in Luzon. It is composed of two mountain ranges within the Cordillera Central with numerous rivers and creeks all draining towards the Saltan River. Mount Sapocoy is the highest peak at 2,456 meters. It is located at the western boundary of the park overlooking the Ilocos and Cagayan Valley. The lowest point in the park, with an elevation of 700 meters, is at Balbalan in the eastern portion.

Wildlife

An important center for biodiversity conservation, the park is home to 89 species of birds, of which 39 are endemic to the Philippines and 2 of them can only be found in Luzon, the Isabela oriole (Oriolus isabellae) and flame-breasted fruit dove (Ptilinopus marchei). While none of the recorded species in the park is critical or endangered, four species of birds are categorized vulnerable (2002 IUCN Red List of Threatened Species), among them are the whiskered pitta (Pitta kochi), Luzon water-redstart (Ryacornis bicolor) and Luzon jungle flycatcher (Rhinomyas insignis).

In addition, 23 species of mammals, 13 species of amphibians, 13 species of reptiles and 25 species of earthworms have also been documented. Among them are the Philippine warty pig, Luzon striped rat, Northern Luzon giant cloud rat, Kalinga narrowmouth toad, and Luzon narrow-mouthed frog. Two of these mammal species are listed as endangered, namely the Luzon pygmy fruit bat and the Luzon bushy-tailed cloud rat.

At elevations above 1,000 m., the park consists of hardwood, pine and mossy forests. A species of Rafflesia flower has also been discovered in the park.

See also
List of national parks of the Philippines

References

National parks of the Philippines
Forests of the Philippines
Protected areas established in 1972
1972 establishments in the Philippines
Geography of Kalinga (province)